The Money Collection Act (255/2006) is a law in Finland that establishes the requirement for a permit to solicit donations. The law has got worldwide media attention twice: once when delaying crowdfunding of a textbook and the second time when Finnish Police Board targeted Wikimedia Foundation for raising funds.

References 

Law of Finland